Irving Howard Romaine (born 8 August 1972), previously incorrectly known as Irvine Romaine, is a Bermudian cricketer, who played with the Bermudian cricket team in their first ever One Day International when they played Canada on 17 May 2006. Romaine scored 25 runs as Bermuda won the game by three wickets under the Duckworth-Lewis method.  He went on to score 110 runs in three ODIs in the tournament, followed by a century (the first in ODIs for Bermuda) in his fourth One-day International innings in August 2006.

He has since gone on to play for Bermuda in 35 ODIs, also playing in 17 ICC Intercontinental Cup matches, the 2006 ICC Americas Championship, the 2005 ICC Trophy and the 2006 Stanford 20/20.

He works as a schoolteacher.

References

External links
 

1972 births
Living people
Bermudian cricketers
Bermuda One Day International cricketers
Bermuda Twenty20 International cricketers
Bermuda cricket captains